Michaela Walsh (born 17 December  1998) is an Irish junior record-holding hammer thrower and shotputter from Midfield,  Swinford, County Mayo.

Athletics career 
Walsh's first experience at international competitions was at the European Youth Olympic Festival in Utrecht in 2013, where she finished tenth in the final. A year later, she qualified for the Summer Youth Olympics in Nanjing, China, where she attained sixth place in the shot-put final with 15.69 m. In 2015 she participated in the World Youth Championships in Cali, Colombia, and finishing ninth in the shot put and tenth with the hammer. A year later, she finished in eleventh place in the shot put with 14.73 m, at the World U20 Championships in Bydgoszcz, Poland. In 2017, while ranked fourth in the hammer and sixth in the shot, she entered the European U20 Championships in Grosseto, Italy, and winning bronze in the hammer with a throw of 61.27 meters. In addition, she finished in seventh place in the shot put.

In 2017 and 2018, Walsh became Irish Indoor Champion in Shot Put.

Results 
 Shot Put: 16.13 m, 17 June 2017 in Bedford
 Shot Put (Indoor): 15.36 m, 17 February 2018 in Abbotstown
 Hammer: 63.01 m, 1 July 2017 in Tullamore

Awards 
 Mayo Association Dublin - Mayo Young Person of the Year Award

External links

References 

Athletes (track and field) at the 2014 Summer Youth Olympics
1998 births
Irish female hammer throwers
Irish female shot putters
Sportspeople from County Mayo
Living people
People from Swinford, County Mayo
Irish LGBT sportspeople